The 2021 U Sports Women's Volleyball Championship was scheduled to be held March 19–21, 2021, in Vancouver, British Columbia, to determine a national champion for the 2020–21 U Sports women's volleyball season. However, the due to the ongoing COVID-19 pandemic in Canada, it was announced on October 15, 2020 that the tournament was cancelled. It was the second consecutive year that the national championship was cancelled due to the pandemic.

The tournament was scheduled to be played at War Memorial Gymnasium at the University of British Columbia. It would have been the third time that UBC had hosted the tournament with the most recent occurring in 1983.

Scheduled teams
Canada West Representative
OUA Representative
RSEQ Representative
AUS Representative
Host (UBC Thunderbirds)
Two assigned berths from Canada West
One assigned berth from OUA

References

External links 
 Tournament Web Site

U Sports volleyball
2021 in women's volleyball
University of British Columbia
Usports Women's Volleyball Championship, 2021